The IOA Invitational was a tournament on the Symetra Tour, the LPGA's developmental tour. It was a part of the Symetra Tour's schedule between 2018 and 2020. It was held at Atlanta National Golf Club in Milton, Georgia.

Elizabeth Szokol was the inaugural champion, and in 2019 María Parra prevailed over Leona Maguire, Ssu-Chia Cheng and Madison Pressel in a five-hole playoff hole for her first Symetra Tour victory.

The tournament in 2020 was cancelled due to the COVID-19 pandemic.

Winners

References

External links

Coverage on Symetra Tour website

Former Symetra Tour events
Golf in Georgia (U.S. state)